Alexander Vishnevsky may refer to:

Aleksandr Leonidovich Vishnevsky (1861–1943), Russian/Soviet actor
Alexander Alexandrovich Vishnevsky (1906–1975), Soviet physician
Alexander Vasilyevich Vishnevsky, Soviet physician, see USSR State Prize

See also 

 Vishnevsky (disambiguation)